Corystusidae is a family of echinoderms belonging to the order Holasteroida.

Genera:
 Cardabia Foster & Philip, 1978
 Corystus Pomel, 1883
 Galeraster
 Huttonechinus Foster & Philip, 1978

References

Holasteroida
Echinoidea genera